Marquess of Ormond may refer to:

 Marquess of Ormonde (Ireland), a title in the Peerage of Ireland
 Marquess of Ormond (Scotland), a title in the Peerage of Scotland